Hongyazi may refer to these places in China:

Hongyazi, Liaoning, a town in Xingcheng, Liaoning
Hongyazi Township, Pingluo County, Ningxia